390 b.c. - The Glorious Dawn is the first demo by the Italian heavy/folk metal band Furor Gallico. The album was released in December 2008 in Milan, Italy.

Track listing 
Furor Gallico consists of the following tracks: 

Songs in Italian
La Caccia Morta
Medhelan
Songs in English
The Gods Have Returned
Cathubodva

References

Demo albums
2008 albums
Furor Gallico albums